"The Sound" is a song recorded by South Korean boy band Stray Kids, taken from their debut Japanese-language studio album The Sound. It was released on January 28, 2023, as the album's lead single through Epic Records Japan. The song was written by 3Racha, D&H (Purple Night), Zack Djurich, and Kyle Reynolds.

Background and release

On December 23, 2022, Stray Kids uploaded the trailer video to announce that they would release their debut Japanese-language studio album on February 22, 2023. The title of the album, The Sound, and its details were revealed on January 16, 2023, including the track listing, which appeared the title track, "The Sound", as the first track. The song was released initially on January 28, a month before its parent album release. The accompanying music video premiered on February 10, preceded by three teasers.

Composition

"The Sound" was written by 3Racha, an in-house production team of Stray Kids consisting of Bang Chan, Changbin and Han, and co-composed with American producers Zack Djurich and Kyle Reynolds. D&H (Purple Night) was handled in Japanese lyrics. It was composed in the key of F♯ minor, 188 beats per minute with a running time of three minutes. "The Sound" is an electronic rock song, depicts the group's confidence and attitude toward their music. Akiko Watabe from Real Sound described that the song "shows an insatiable passion for music with the contrast between stillness and movement."

Live performances

Stray Kids gave the debut performance of "The Sound" at Music Station on January 27, 2023. They also performed the song at Buzz Rhythm 02 on February 17. The group added the song to the setlist of the encore shows of Maniac World Tour in Saitama and Osaka, Japan.

Credits and personnel
Locations
 Sony Music Publishing (Japan) Inc. – publishing
 JYP Publishing (KOMCA) – publishing
 Copyright Control – publishing
 JYPE Studios – recording
 The Mastering Palace – mastering

Personnel
 Stray Kids – vocals, background vocals
 Bang Chan (3Racha) – lyrics, composition, arrangement, all instruments, computer programming, vocal directing, digital editing
 Changbin (3Racha) – lyrics, composition, vocal directing
 Han (3Racha) – lyrics, composition, vocal directing
 D&H (Purple Night) – Japanese lyrics
 Zach Djurich – composition, arrangement, all instruments, computer programming
 Kyle Reynolds – composition, arrangement
 Lee Kyeong-won – digital editing
 Goo Hye-jin – recording
 Curtis Douglas – mixing
 Dave Kutch – mastering

Charts

Release history

References

2023 singles
2023 songs
Japanese-language songs
Sony Music Entertainment Japan singles
Stray Kids songs